Muhammad Tahir-ul-Qadri (‎; born 19 February 1951) is a Pakistani–Canadian Islamic scholar and former politician who founded Minhaj-ul-Quran International and Pakistan Awami Tehreek.

He was also a professor of international constitutional law at the University of the Punjab. Qadri is also the founding chairman of various sub-organisations of Minhaj-ul-Quran International. He has been included in all editions for the rankings of The 500 Most Influential Muslims since its first edition in 2009.

Early years
Muhammad Tahir ul Qadri was born on 19 February 1951 in the Jhang District of Pakistan. He received non-religious and Islamic Education at a young age. He is the student of Tahir Allauddin Al-Qadri Al-Gillani. He also received a First Class degree, an MA in Islamic Studies and a PhD in Islamic Law from the University of Punjab where he worked as a lecturer and then as Professor of Law.

Minhaj-ul-Quran

The organisation, Minhaj-ul-Quran International which he founded on 17 October 1980, currently has its branches in over hundred countries.
The organisation claims to promote religious moderation, effective and sound education, inter-faith dialogue and harmony, and a moderate interpretation of Islam supposedly employing methods of Sufism. During its March 2011 session, the United Nations Economic and Social Council granted special consultative status to Minhaj-ul-Quran International.

Political career

He founded Pakistan Awami Tehreek (PAT) in May 1989. He contested elections in 1990 where he was elected as a Member of the National Assembly. On 29 November 2004, Qadri announced his resignation as a Member of the National Assembly protesting the dictatorial counter terrorism policies of the then President Pervez Musharraf. In 2005 he moved to Canada.

Long March 2012

In December 2012, after living for seven years in Toronto, Canada, Qadri returned to Pakistan and initiated a political campaign. Qadri called for a "million-men" march in Islamabad to protest against the government's corruption. He demand the creation of an independent body to conduct electoral reforms that would pave way for free and fair elections, and said that if the constitutional requirements were not fulfilled then he would reject the upcoming elections. On 14 January 2013, a crowd marched down the city's main avenue. Thousands of people pledged to sit-in until their demands were met. When he started the long march from Lahore about 50,000 people were with him. He told the rally in front of parliament: "There is no Parliament; there is a group of looters, thieves and dacoits [bandits] ... Our lawmakers are the lawbreakers." After four days of sit-in, the Government and Qadri signed an agreement called the Islamabad Long March Declaration, which promised electoral reforms and increased political transparency.

Critics have charged that the protests were a ploy by the Pakistan Armed Forces to delay elections and weaken the influence of the civilian government, citing Qadri's close ties to the military, dual nationality and suspect foreign and Pakistani sources of funding. Lawyers for the Supreme Court of Pakistan claimed that Qadri's demands are unfeasible because they conflict with the Constitution of Pakistan. The Tribune reported on 17 February 2013, that Qadri seemed to have capitulated on most of his demands in the Islamabad Long March Declaration.

Long March 2014

On 17 June 2014, a violent clash occurred between the Punjab Police and Pakistan Awami Tehreek activists resulting in the deaths of several protesters from police gunfire. Tahir-ul-Qadri said the police refused to log a First Information Report. The Baqir Najfi inquiry found that police actively participated in the massacre to remove barriers that were installed on orders of the High Court. 

Tahir-ul-Qadri's flight was due to land at Islamabad airport however the Pakistani authorities refused landing permission and the plane was diverted to Lahore airport. Tahir-ul-Qadri believed he would be harmed by the Punjab government and was personally escorted by the convoy of Governor of Punjab to his residence in Model Town, Lahore. 

As of the end of September 2014, the Inqilab March began, with sit-in protests with allied partner Imran Khan, chairman and founder of Tehreek-e-Insaaf (PTI) and organiser of 2014 Azadi March, in the capital of Pakistan, Islamabad.

Imran Khan and Tahir-ul-Qadri did not fully join their protest marches nor decline to support each other. On 10 August 2014, Qadri formally announced that his party's political march, the Inqilab March, would proceed parallel with PTI's Azadi march. Both marches were organised to take different routes, albeit closely mirroring each other.  It is apparent that the two parties have similar objectives yet different aims and strategies.  The announcement of two parallel marches by parties in opposition gave rise to speculation that a coalition between PTI and PAT was possible.  The chiefs of the two parties never clearly stipulated a formal coalition; but an informal agreement to support each other was achieved.

On 21 August 2014, Qadri said that the government had not been allowing his workers to supply food items and potable water to the participants of the sit-in.

The Daily Dawn of 31 August 2014 claimed that hundreds of people were injured in the federal capital as police battled throngs of protesters led by Pakistan Tehreek-i-Insaf and Pakistan Awami Tehreek.

Then Prime Minister Nawaz Sharif appointed Chief of Army Staff General Raheel Sharif to act as a mediator. General Raheel Sharif met with Tahir-ul-Qadri and Imran Khan to end the sit-in. It was due to the intervention of General Raheel Sharif that the police report was logged. Tahir-ul-Qadri congratuled his supporters in their struggle for justice.

It was reported that Tahir-ul-Qadri led the Eid prayer at Islamabad's D-Chowk. The congregation was attended by Imran Khan and other political leaders, including Raja Nasir Abbas Jafary of MWM.  Animal sacrifies were also offered in the name of Allah following the Sunnah of Prophet Ibrahim and his son Prophet Ismail.

Events

Anti-Terrorism Camp
In August 2010, Qadri held an anti-terrorism camp for Muslim youth at the University of Warwick with the aim of tackling extremism in the UK. He organised the camp under the auspices of Minhaj-ul-Quran UK.

World Economic Forum 

In 2011, he spoke at the WEF that took place in Davos, Switzerland.

Lahore Public Gathering 2014
Seven days after the Faisalabad Gathering, Qadri made a public gathering in Lahore on 19 October 2014.

Lahore Clash 2014

The 2014 Lahore Clash, more commonly known as the Model Town Tragedy or the Lahore massacre, was a violent clash that ensued between the Punjab Police and Pakistan Awami Tehreek activists on 17 June 2014 resulting in several protesters being killed by the police gunfire. Five police officers remain under arrest. The standoff lasted for almost 11 hours when the police's anti-encroachment squad launched an operation to remove the barriers from the road leading to the offices of Minhaj-ul-Quran and the residence of PAT founder Muhammad Tahir-ul-Qadri in Model Town, Lahore. Although, police officials were given a court order by PAT leaders, stating "due to terrorism issues, place security barriers in front of Minhaj-ul-Quran and the residence of PAT founder Qadri", but the police still attacked.

The incident was broadcast live on various local news channels and there were conflicting accounts of how the standoff began. Police claimed that they were attacked by people inside the PAT secretariat, a claim that is denied by party chief Qadri. In the live footage broadcast on television, the policemen were shown firing assault rifles and lobbing tear gas canisters at the protesting masses while the protesters threw stones at the police for defence.
Qadri strongly condemned the attack and called it the worst form of state terrorism. Qadri vowed to avenge the deaths of his political workers by bringing about a revolution that would hasten the end of the rule of prime minister Nawaz Sharif and his brother Shahbaz Sharif.

The Day of Martyrs
Qadri and his party observed Youm-e-Shuhada (Day of Martyrs) at 9 August 2014 in Tehreek-e-Minhaj ul Quran secretariat in Model Town. A Country-Wide clash occurred between Police and the Workers of PAT. After the gathering of People, He assured his supporters and the government that the rally on 10 August would be peaceful while requesting his followers to bring their prayer mats for recitation of the Quran.

Other Events
He has been invited to deliver his lectures by several organisations.

In July 2011, he gave a lecture on the issues of terrorism and integration at the Parliament of New South Wales in Sydney, Australia where he was invited by the member of the NSW Legislative Council, Shaoquett Moselmane MLC. Qadri also made appearances on Australian media, where he discussed Islam, terrorism and possible troop withdrawals from Afghanistan. On 24 September 2011, Minhaj-ul-Quran convened the "Peace for Humanity Conference" at Wembley Arena in London where Tahir-ul-Qadri and the assembled speakers issued a declaration of peace on behalf of religious representatives of several faiths, scholars, politicians, and 12,000 participants present from various countries. This conference was endorsed by, or received supportive messages from, the Grand Imam of Al-Azhar University, Ban Ki-Moon (Secretary General of the United Nations), Ekmeleddin Ihsanoglu (Secretary General of the Organisation of Islamic Cooperation), David Cameron (British Prime Minister), Nick Clegg (British Deputy Prime Minister), Rowan Williams (Archbishop of Canterbury) and others. On 30 November 2011, Qadri delivered a lecture at the "Peaceful Future of Afghanistan" conference in Istanbul, Turkey which was organised by the Center for World Religions, Diplomacy and Conflict Resolution of George Mason University together with Marmara University and was attended by more than 120 Afghan leaders.

On 22 February 2012, Qadri visited Delhi for a four-week tour of India. Qadri delivered a message of peace and said: "Terrorism has no place in Islam", while addressing the fatwa book launch in Delhi. People gathered to listen to Qadri along with government officials in Gujarat.
 Qadri also urged the Pakistani and Indian governments to reduce their defence expenditures and instead spend money on the welfare of poor people. He also visited Ajmer, where he was given a large reception, at which he gave a lecture on Sufism.
On 4 January 2015, he declared terrorism as biggest problem of the world.

Fatwa on Terrorism

The Fatwa on Terrorism and Suicide Bombings is a 600-page (Urdu version), 512-page (English version) is an Islamic decree by Qadri which demonstrates from the Quran and Sunnah that terrorism and suicide bombings are unjust and evil, and thus un-Islamic. It was published in London as a book. This fatwa is a direct refutation of the ideology of al-Qaeda and the Taliban. It is one of the most extensive Islamic anti-terrorism rulings, an "absolute" condemnation of terrorism without "any excuses or pretexts" which goes further than ever and declares that terrorism is kufr under Islamic law. The launch was organised by Minhaj-ul-Quran UK. Qadri said during the launch that "Terrorism is terrorism, violence is violence and it has no place in Islamic teaching and no justification can be provided for it, or any kind of excuses or ifs or buts."

The fatwa received widespread media attention and was positively covered by the international press.

According to CNN, experts see the fatwa as a significant blow to terrorist recruiting. CNN's Amanpour show added the fatwa summary to its website and declared it to be fatwa for peace, while the US State Department declares the fatwa to be significant step in taking Islam back from terrorists.

Before it had been released, Douglas Murray described the Fatwa on Terrorism, in an article in the Evening Standard, as "potentially important", although he said "A single-fatwa will not change the level of denial and self criticism inherent in so much of modern Islam".

ITV news channel questioned the credibility of the fatwa and asks if it was not by the British government because senior counter-terrorism officials from Scotland Yard and MI5 were present at the launch.

The 512-page English book version of the fatwa, Fatwa on Terrorism and Suicide Bombings, (London: Minhaj-ul-Quran, 2011. ) has a foreword by John Esposito and an introduction by Joel Hayward, both of whom share Qadri's scholarly assessment that, regardless of any intention, the evil of terrorism remains evil and must be exposed, opposed and condemned. It also has a certification from the Islamic Research Council of Al-Azhar, Egypt issued on 9 January 2011. 

The Fatwa on Terrorism and Suicide Bombings has been officially endorsed by Al-Azhar University in Cairo, Egypt. In January 2011, the fatwa was discussed at the World Economic Forum Annual Meeting 2011. In June 2011, Pope Benedict XVI received a copy of the fatwa from representatives of Minhaj Interfaith Relations. The Pope reportedly appreciated that it promoted peace, harmony and interfaith dialogue.

The Fatwa on Terrorism and Suicide Bombings was reviewed positively by Kemal Argon who published a review in the Journal of Rotterdam Islamic and Social Sciences, Vol. 2, No. 1, 2011, pp. 149–160. Islamic University of Rotterdam, Netherlands.

Invitation to OIC
On 7 April 2019, Qadri addressed scholars at the  OIC meeting in Riyadh and presented Minhaj-ul-Quran's Counter Terrorism Syllabus.

Views
According to one newspaper pundit, the legal-theological opinion by Qadri in his fatwa on terrorism creates an impression that there is a consensus in Islam on the Khawarij. Think Magazine (World Religions) cited Dr. Tahir ul Qadri as providing a competing vision of Islam against that of Osama Bin Laden. In November 2017, Mandla Mandela (the grandson of South African revolutionary leader Nelson Mandela) visited Pakistan after his conversion to Islam in 2016. He arrived in Pakistan on Tahir ul Qadri's invitation to attend Tajdar-e-Khatam-e-Nabuwwat Conference in Pakistan.

Works

He has authored 1000 works out of which 550 are published books, including  an "eight-volume, 7,000-page Qur’anic Encyclopaedia in English covering all 6,000-plus verses of the Koran." He has delivered over 6000 lectures and has been teaching subjects such as Islamic jurisprudence, theology, sufism, Islamic philosophy, law, Islamic politics, hadith, seerah, and many other traditional sciences. His works include:

Islamic Concept of Crime (1985)
Islamic Concept of Law (1987)
Islam and Christianity (1999)
Peace & Submission (2011)
Muhammad the Merciful (2014)
Fatwa on Suicide Bombings and Terrorism (2014) translated by Shaykh Abdul Aziz Dabbagh
Islam on Mercy and Compassion (2014)
Creation of Man - A Review of Qur'an and Modern Embryology (2017)
Beseeching for Help (Istighathah) published by CreateSpace Independent Publishing Platform in 2017

See also
Minhaj-ul-Quran International
The Amman Message
Contemporary Islamic philosophy
London Declaration for Global Peace and Resistance against Extremism 2011
Minhaj Welfare Foundation
Minhaj University

References

External links

  
A Profile of Shaykh-ul-Islam Dr Muhammad Tahir-ul-Qadri by Minhaj-ul-Quran International

1951 births
Living people
People from Jhang District
Naturalized citizens of Canada
Pakistani emigrants to Canada
Islamic philosophers
Muslim reformers
Pakistani Sunni Muslim scholars of Islam
21st-century Muslim scholars of Islam
Pakistan Awami Tehreek politicians
Pakistani translators
Translators of the Quran into English
Academic staff of the University of the Punjab
Minhaj-ul-Quran
University of the Punjab alumni
Barelvis
Pakistani MNAs 2002–2007
Islamic television preachers
Canadian academics of Pakistani descent
Canadian Muslims
Muslim writers
Pakistani religious writers
Canadian religious writers
21st-century translators